Mohammad Nur Ahmad Etemadi (22 February 1921 – 16 September 1979) was an Afghan diplomat and politician.

Etemadi was born in Kandahar, Afghanistan. He served as ambassador to Pakistan for the first time from 1964 to 1965. He was appointed Foreign Minister in 1965 and became Prime Minister of Afghanistan on 1 November 1967. Due to a failure to improve the stagnating economy, he lost both positions on 9 June 1971 and became ambassador to Italy. Unlike many politicians who were prominent under the rule of Zahir Shah, Etemadi remained in the government after the 1973 coup in which a republic was established under the rule of Mohammed Daoud Khan. Etemadi left Italy and served as ambassador to the Soviet Union until 1976. He then served as ambassador to Pakistan until the Communist coup of 1978.

Etemadi returned to Afghanistan and was arrested by the Communist government. In 1979, along with many other officials in the Zahir Shah and Daud Khan governments, including former prime minister Mohammad Musa Shafiq, Etemadi was executed.

Resignation

References 

Executed prime ministers
Executed Afghan people
20th-century executions by Afghanistan
1921 births
1979 deaths
People from Kandahar
Prime Ministers of Afghanistan
Government ministers of Afghanistan
Ambassadors of Afghanistan to Pakistan
Ambassadors of Afghanistan to Italy
Foreign ministers of Afghanistan
Ambassadors of Afghanistan to the Soviet Union